Khajag is an Armenian given name and surname. Notable people with the name include:

 Khajag Barsamian, Armenian religious figure
 Karekin Khajag, Armenian journalist, writer, political activist, and educator

Armenian given names
Armenian-language surnames